Major General Robert Rusoke is a Ugandan military officer and diplomat. Currently he serves as Uganda's Ambassador to the Republic of South Sudan. He was appointed to that position in August 2012. Prior to that appointment, he served as the Joint Chief of Staff of the Uganda People's Defence Forces.

See also
 Fredrick Mugisha
 Wilson Mbadi
 Muhoozi Kainerugaba

References

External links
 Partial List of Senior UPDF Commanders

Succession table as Joint Chief of Staff of the UPDF

Living people
Ugandan military personnel
Ambassadors of Uganda to South Sudan
Year of birth missing (living people)
Ugandan generals